Yaba Badoe (born 1955) is a Ghanaian-British documentary filmmaker, journalist and author.

Career 
Yaba Badoe was born in Tamale, northern Ghana. She left Ghana to be educated in Britain at a very young age. A graduate of King's College, Cambridge, Badoe worked as a civil servant at the Ministry of Foreign Affairs in Ghana, before beginning her career in journalism as a trainee at the BBC. She also was a researcher at the Institute of African Studies at the University of Ghana. She has taught in Spain and Jamaica and has worked as a producer and director making documentaries for the main television channels in Britain. Among her credits are: Black and White (1987), an investigation into race and racism in Bristol, using hidden video cameras for BBC1; I Want Your Sex (1991), an arts documentary exploring images and myths surrounding black sexuality in Western art, literature, film and photography, for Channel 4; and the six-part series Voluntary Service Overseas for ITV in 2002.

In addition to making films, Badoe is a creative writer, her first novel, True Murder, being published in London by Jonathan Cape in 2009.  Reviewing True Murder in The Africa Report, Zagba Oyortey described it as "a rich complex of wonder, loss, friendship and prescience from the viewpoint of Ajuba, an African girl transposed from her idyllic home in Ghana to a boarding school in rural England after the collapse of her parents’ marriage." Her short story "The Rivals" was included in the anthology African Love Stories (Ayebia, 2006), edited by Ama Ata Aidoo. She has also written three children's books. 

Badoe directed and co-produced (with Amina Mama) the documentary film The Witches of Gambaga, which won Best Documentary at the Black International Film Festival in 2010, and was awarded Second Prize in the Documentary section of FESPACO 2011. Her most recent film, launched in 2014, is entitled The Art of Ama Ata Aidoo. 

In 2016, she participated in "Telling Our Stories of Home: Exploring and Celebrating Changing African and Africa-Diaspora Communities" in Chapel Hill, NC.

She is a contributor to the 2019 anthology New Daughters of Africa, edited by Margaret Busby.

Filmography 
A Time of Hope (1983)
Crowning Glory (1986)
Black and White (1987)
I Want Your Sex (1991)
Supercrips and Rejects (1996)
Race in the Frame (1996)
A Commitment to Care – The Capable State (1997)
Am I My Brother’s Keeper? (2002)
Voluntary Service Overseas (2002)
One to One (2003)
Secret World of Voodoo: Africa – Coming Home (2006)
Honorable Women (2010)
The Witches of Gambaga (2010)
The Art of Ama Ata Aidoo (2014)

Bibliography
 True Murder (Jonathan Cape, 2009)
 A Jigsaw of Fire and Stars (Zephyr/Head of Zeus, 2017)
 The Secret of the Purple Lake (Cassava Republic Press, 2017), five interlinked stories
 Wolf Light (Zephyr/Head of Zeus, 2019)
 Lionheart Girl (Zephyr/Head of Zeus, 2021)

References

External links 
 Geosi Gyasi, "An Interview with Ghanaian – British Writer, Yaba Badoe", Geosi Reads, 17 March 2011.
 "A Conversation with Yaba Badoe", African Women in Cinema, 1 September 2011.
 Facebook Fan Page
 Schedule of events, Telling Our Stories of Home
 Karin Sohlgren, "Yaba Badoe - interview on film project on female African Writers with Ama Ata Aidoo", YouTube video, 13 April 2012.

1955 births
Living people
Alumni of King's College, Cambridge
Ghanaian film directors
Ghanaian women novelists
Ghanaian film producers
Ghanaian emigrants to England
Ghanaian women film directors
Ghanaian women film producers
Black British women writers
Academic staff of the University of Ghana
21st-century British women writers
21st-century English novelists
Ghanaian novelists